The Open Sopra Steria de Lyon is a tennis tournament held in Lyon, France, since 2016. The event is part of the ATP Challenger Tour and is played on outdoor clay courts.

Past finals

Singles

Doubles

References 
 Official ATP Tour website

External links 
 

 
ATP Challenger Tour
Clay court tennis tournaments
Tennis tournaments in France
Recurring sporting events established in 2016